Kent Ford (born 1957) is a former American slalom canoeist who competed from the late 1970s to the early 1990s.

He won two gold medals in the C1 team event at the ICF Canoe Slalom World Championships, earning them in 1983 and 1985.

World Cup individual podiums

References

American male canoeists
Living people
1957 births
International whitewater paddlers
Medalists at the ICF Canoe Slalom World Championships